The Fighting Edge is a 1926 American action film directed by Henry Lehrman and written by Edward T. Lowe Jr. and Jack Wagner. It is based on the 1922 novel The Fighting Edge by William MacLeod Raine. The film stars Kenneth Harlan, Patsy Ruth Miller, David Kirby, Heinie Conklin, Pat Hartigan and Lew Harvey. The film was released by Warner Bros. on January 8, 1926.

Cast      
Kenneth Harlan as Juan de Dios O'Rourke
Patsy Ruth Miller as Phoebe Joyce
David Kirby as Gilette
Heinie Conklin as Chuck 
Pat Hartigan as Taggert
Lew Harvey as Bailey
Eugene Pallette as Simpson
Pat Harmon as Hadley
William A. Carroll as Mr. Joyce

References

External links
 

1926 films
American action films
1920s action films
Warner Bros. films
Films directed by Henry Lehrman
American black-and-white films
American silent feature films
1920s English-language films
1920s American films